Barbara Frietchie is a 1915 silent drama film directed by Herbert Blaché and starring Mary Miles Minter. It is based upon the 1899 play Barbara Frietchie by Clyde Fitch, which was in turn inspired by the John Greenleaf Whittier poem of the same name. As with many of Minter's movies, the film is thought to be a lost film.

Plot

The film is set in Frederick, Maryland, during the American Civil War. As described in film magazines, young Barbara Frietchie (Minter), just turned eighteen, lives with her grandmother and namesake (Whiffen) in a town occupied by Northern troops. She falls for Captain Trumbull (Coombs), a Union officer, to the disappointment of her father (Sealy), but her grandmother supports the match. When the Confederate forces re-take the town, Captain Trumbull is shot and severely wounded by Barbara's brother (Scott), a Confederate officer. Although he is carried to the Frietchie home and cared for by Barbara and her grandmother, Captain Trumbull dies from his injuries. Both Barbaras are devastated, and wave the stars and stripes from their balcony in defiance of the passing Confederate soldiers. One of these soldiers, Jack Negly (Fraunholz), a suitor whom Barbara had rejected in favour of Captain Trumbull, fires a single shot at the balcony. The bullet hits the younger Barbara, and she is re-united in death with her Union sweetheart.

Cast
 Blanche Whiffen (billed as Mrs. Thomas Whiffen) as Barbara Frietchie
 Mary Miles Minter as Barbara, Mrs Frietchie's granddaughter
 Guy Coombs as Captain Trumbull
 Fraunie Fraunholz as Jack Negly
 Lewis Sealy as Judge Frietchie
 Wallace Scott as Arthur Frietchie
 Frederick Heck as Colonel Negly
 Anna Q. Nilsson as Sue Negly

Trivia
The December 1915 issue of Photoplay notes an incident from filming wherein Minter accidentally shot her co-star William Morse in the arm – fortunately the wound did not prove to be serious.

References

External links

1915 films
1915 drama films
Silent American drama films
American silent feature films
American black-and-white films
Lost American films
Metro Pictures films
1915 lost films
Lost drama films
Films directed by Herbert Blaché
1910s American films